A sugar-baker was the owner of a sugar house, a factory for the refining of raw sugar from Barbados. Sugar refining would normally be combined with sugar trading, which was a lucrative business. The architectural historian Kerry Downes gives an example of one sugar baker's house in Liverpool being estimated to bring in £40,000 a year in trade from Barbados.

Sources and external links
 Kerry Downes. Sir John Vanbrugh: A Biography (London: Sidgwick and Jackson, 1987)
 "Industries: Introduction"—A History of the County of Middlesex: Volume 2: General; Ashford, East Bedfont with Hatton, Feltham, Hampton with Hampton Wick, Hanworth, Laleham, Littleton (1911), pp. 121–132. (Date accessed: 31 March 2006)
"Sugar Refiners & Sugarbakers"—A database of some of those involved in the sugar refining industry, mainly in the UK, 16th to 20th century. (Date accessed: 6 September 2008)

Obsolete occupations
History of sugar